Nasirabad (also Romanized as Naşīrābād) is a village in Dul Rural District, in the Central District of Urmia County, West Azerbaijan Province, Iran. At the 2006 census, its population was 416, in 76 families.

References 

Populated places in Urmia County